A leister is a type of spear used for fishing.

Leister may also refer to:

 Leister Technologies, a Swiss company
 Leister Peak, located in Marie Byrd Land, Antarctica
 Trident, a three-pronged spear 

People with the surname Leister:

 Brenton Leister (born 1985), English football player
 Frederick Leister (1885–1970), English actor
 John Leister (born 1961), former starting pitcher in Major League Baseball
 Karl Leister (born 1937), world-renowned classical clarinet player

See also
 Leinster
 Leicester